Song for Africa (SFA) is a Canadian non-profit organization founded in 2006 by music and movie producer Darcy Ataman. Participants in the Song for Africa Music Enrichment Program learn how to write, perform, produce, and disseminate their music on the local radio.  Song for Africa is currently working in Kenya, Rwanda, and the Democratic Republic of the Congo.

History
In the spring of 2006 several Canadian musicians came together to write and record the single Song for Africa to raise awareness of the AIDS pandemic in Africa. Following the premiere at the International AIDS Conference in Toronto, the non-profit organization ‘Song for Africa’ (SFA) emerged as a way for participating artists to further promote efforts in the fight against HIV/AIDS.

In partnership with Free The Children and CARE Kenya, the first Song for Africa documentary captured everyday stories of communities affected by HIV/AIDS. The film featured Ian D'Sa (Billy Talent), Damhnait Doyle, Luke McMaster and Simon Wilcox, who traveled to Kenya in the summer of 2007.

A second documentary in 2009, Rwanda: Rises Up!, focused on the resilience of the Rwandan nation and the progress made since the genocide in 1994. The accompanying full length album (released by Sony Music) featured Canadian artists including Sarah Slean, Steve Bays (Hot Hot Heat), Damhnait Doyle and Tim Edwards (Crash Parallel) who participated in the film, as well as Ian D'Sa (Billy Talent), Cone McCaslin (Sum 41/Operation MD), Classified, and The Trews.

Darcy Ataman has continued to travel to Rwanda and more recently to the Democratic Republic of the Congo in order to develop partnerships for the Song for Africa Music Enrichment Program. Potential partnerships with programs working with child soldiers together with Roméo Dallaire's Child Soldier Initiative have been explored, as well as one with the Panzi Hospital.

Documentaries
 Song for Africa
 Rwanda: Rises Up!!

Albums
 A Song for Africa
 Rwanda: Rises Up!

Partners
 Canadian International Development Agency
 The University of Winnipeg Global College
 Child Soldiers Initiative
 MetalWorks Institute of Sound and Music Production
 Uyisenga N'Manzi
 Slaight Communications

Artists

 Billy Talent (Ian D'Sa)
 Operation M.D/Sum 41 (Cone McCaslin)
 Hot Hot Heat (Steve Bays)
 Damhnait Doyle
 The Trews
 Barenaked Ladies
 Alexisonfire
 Crash Parallel
 Chantal Kreviazuk
 The Weakerthans
 Luke McMaster
 Choclair
 Thornley
 Simon Wilcox
 Grand Analog
 Noble Blood
 Saint Alvia
 Big Sugar
 Eva Availia
 Ill Scarlet
 Faber Drive
 The Agonist
 SBT
 Rafiki
 K-8
 Miss JoJo
 Itorero
 Holy Jah Doves
 Mike Boyd
 Queen Gaga And The Heaveners
 White Mic

References 

Music organizations based in Canada
HIV/AIDS in Africa
2006 establishments in Canada